The Enterprise Turnaround Initiative Corporation of Japan, or ETIC-J,  is a Japanese incorporated company, 50 percent (10,000,000,000 yen) owned by the Japanese government and the rest by about 130 private enterprises, which was established in 2009 under the "Enterprise Turnaround Initiative Corporation Law", to support the turnaround of the small and medium-sized corporations that have found themselves in difficulties, in spite of some useful management capabilities.  It continues the role of the Industrial Revitalization Corporation of Japan, or IRC-J, that had existed from 2003 to 2007, under the same law.

Companies that have been supported by ETIC-J
 Small and medium-sized companies
 Japan Airlines (2009 - 2012)
 Willcom (2010 - )

See also

 Chapter 11 (US)
 Insolvency (UK)

External links
 ETIC-J official site  
 ETIC-J official site 
 ETIC-J office in Japanese Cabinet Office 

Government of Japan
Bankruptcy